I am Jane Doe is a documentary chronicling the legal battle that several American mothers are waging on behalf of their middle-school daughters who were trafficked for commercial sex on Backpage.com, the classified advertising website formerly owned by the Village Voice.  The film is narrated by Jessica Chastain, directed by filmmaker Mary Mazzio, and produced by Mazzio along with Alec Sokolow. Fifty percent of the film's profits will go to non-profit organizations which serve children affected by human trafficking.

Plot 
I am Jane Doe mainly follows the stories and cases of middle school girls from Boston, a 15-year-old from Seattle, and a 13-year-old girl from St. Louis. Their suits against Backpage put them on a collision course with judges, special interest groups, and Section 230 of the Communications Decency Act.

The film also features the attorneys involved with the various lawsuits. The lawyers hail from anywhere from a firm working out of strip mall in Washington state to Ropes & Gray, one of the oldest white-shoe law firms in the country.

I am Jane Doe also follows Congressional actions against Backpage and online human trafficking. The film features interviews from Senator Rob Portman, Senator John McCain, Senator Claire McCaskill, and Senator Heidi Heitkamp.

Release
The film opened on February 10, 2017, in select theaters in New York City, Los Angeles, Washington, D.C., Seattle, Boston, and Philadelphia. The film is available on DVD, by digital download, and, as of May 26, 2017, on Netflix.

Reception 
I am Jane Doe has received generally positive reviews by critics. On review aggregator website Rotten Tomatoes, the film holds an approval rating of 91%, based on 11 reviews, and an average rating of 8/10. On Metacritic, the film has a weighted average score of 69 out of 100, based on 6 critics, indicating "generally favorable reviews".

Ann Hornaday of The Washington Post wrote,"In 'I Am Jane Doe,' filmmaker Mary Mazzio reveals the sordid world of underage sex trafficking, specifically as it pertains to young women who were forced into prostitution, their ‘services’ made available on the online classified site Backpage.com…I am observing the self-evident fact that film has exceptional — maybe even unique — power to shape and inform our norms, expectations and desires. That might be the chief reason it matters so much who makes them... A viscerally emotional case for a common-sense reassessment of the law…’I Am Jane Doe’ offers a gut-wrenching reminder that there are certain rocks we ignore at our peril.”

Katie Walsh of the Los Angeles Times said I am Jane Doe “a powerful call to action.” The film was also highlighted in The New Yorker, Film Journal International, Elle, Vogue, People, and on the NBC Nightly News.

See also 
 Human trafficking in the United States

References

External links

2017 films
American documentary films
2010s English-language films
2010s American films